Tenby Lifeboat Station is a lifeboat station in Tenby, Pembrokeshire, Wales that has been situated to the east of the town since 1852, three generations having been built; the original and updates in 1905 and 2005. The station currently houses two lifeboats.

The  lifeboat is called Haydn Miller, after the farmer who left £3m to the RNLI in his will. The inshore  lifeboat is called Georgina Taylor, (the 3rd ILB donated by the legacy).

History

The station was established in 1852, by The Shipwrecked Fishermen and Mariners' Royal Benevolent Society. The Society still exists, but its Tenby lifeboat activity was taken over in 1854 by the Royal National Lifeboat Institution and the first RNLI boathouse was built on the town's castle beach in 1862. Six RNLI silver medals were awarded for coastal rescues from the station in the 19th century.

A difficulty with launching from the harbour site was the shallow angle of the underlying geological strata. The sand beaches at Tenby were a hazard due to the speed of the tide, and an obstacle to overcome while dragging a 2-ton lifeboat from the harbour. When in 1905 the boat was replaced with a larger and heavier one, a new boathouse and roller slipway were built on the north side of Castle Hill. It was constructed using the new screw-piles that had been created for the foundations in deep sand of Victorian era pleasure piers. The lifeboat was then usable in all weathers and states of tide. It later became a public access way, with the ferry boat to Caldey Island using the slipway as a disembarkation point for tourists. Due to the legal status of foreshore in the UK, the ground on which these lifeboat stations are built has been leased from the Crown Estate.

In 1923, the first motor-powered lifeboat came on station. The lifeboat operated throughout World War II, in part due to the three squadrons of Royal Air Force Short Sunderland flying boats operating from Milford Haven. In 1952 the station was awarded an RNLI Vellum for 100 years of service.

1972-onwards: dual-boat station
From 1972, the station became a dual-boat station with an inshore  lifeboat stationed within the harbour. In 1976, a new ILB boathouse was built on the north side of the harbour to house the boat and a tractor. On 6 September 1986, the  lifeboat RFA Sir Galahad came on station. Named after the Royal Fleet Auxiliary  which was sunk subsequent to being damaged during the Falklands War, it became the last boat to use the original boathouse. By the time the station was awarded its 150 years Vellum by the RNLI in 2002, another new lifeboat house was planned.

Having obtained an extended lease from the Crown Estate, the RNLI obtained planning permission from the council to build a new lifeboat station on the site of the demolished Victorian era pleasure pier. Due to access restrictions via the North Castle cliff, the £5.5million lifeboat station was built from the sea. Only a supply of concrete was approved to be transported by road through the town. Construction, commissioning works and acceptance were completed in March 2005.

Tenby received the first of the new  lifeboats, the Haydn Miller, which  came on station for training in March 2006. While the crew were still under training, the boat had a successful callout in April 2006. .

After being refused planning permission to demolish the old Grade II listed lifeboat station, which had been extended twice to accommodate larger lifeboats, the RNLI eventually sold it into private hands. The new owner agreed the purchase of the freehold from the Crown Estate, and converted it into a four bedroom property. Development of the property was covered by Channel 4 for an episode of Grand Designs, and finished in 2011.

Visitor access
This station is classed as an "Explore" lifeboat station by the RNLI, aiming to offer their best visitor experience. When the boats are not on call, the station offers free access in the summer months, and pre-booked tours in the winter. Visitors can go inside and look around, see the lifeboat and visit the RNLI gift shop.

Fleet

All Weather Boats

Inshore Lifeboats

Awards
Since it was established in 1852, the station and its lifeboat crews have gained the following RNLI awards:
Framed Letter of Thanks 3
Thanks of the Institution Inscribed on Vellum 9
RNLI Bronze Medal 5
RNLI Silver Medal 10

In addition, at least two crew members have been awarded the MBE; Charles Crockford in 2002 and Alan Thomas in 2004.

See also
 Royal National Lifeboat Institution

References

Further reading

External links

 The official website of Tenby lifeboat
 Tenby Lifeboat Station

Lifeboat stations in Wales
Tenby
Grade II listed buildings in Pembrokeshire
1852 in Wales
Transport infrastructure completed in 1852
1852 establishments in Wales